

Universities
 American Institute Of Management Science (AIM-USA)
 All American Institute of Medical Sciences
 B&B University College
 Caribbean Aerospace College
 Caribbean Aviation Training Center
 Caribbean Institute of Technology (CIT)
 Caribbean Maritime University  (CMU)
Caribbean School of Medical Sciences, Jamaica (CSMSJ)
 International University of the Caribbean (IUC)
 Mico University College
 Northern Caribbean University (NCU)
 Royale College
 University of Technology (UTech)
 University of the West Indies, Mona
 University of the Commonwealth Caribbean (UCC)
 Western Hospitality Institute

Teacher training colleges
There are twelve of these in total.
 Bethlehem Moravian College
 Catholic College of Mandeville
 Church Teachers' College
 Mico Teachers' College
 Moneague College
 Montego Bay Community College
 Saint Joseph's Teachers' College
 Sam Sharpe Teachers College
 Shortwood Teacher College
Hydel College of Jamaica

Community colleges
There are fourteen of these in total.
 Brown's Town Community College
 Excelsior Community College
 Excelsior Community College (St Thomas) 
 Knox Community College (Cobbla)
 Knox Community College (Mandeville)
 Knox Community College (May Pen)
 Knox Community College (Spalding)
 Mandeville Legal College
 Moneague Community College (St. Ann)
 Montego Bay Community College (MBCC)
 Portmore Community College Old Harbour
 Portmore Community College Portmore 
 Saint John's College (Nursing)

Other colleges
 Bethel Bible College
 Caribbean Graduate School of Theology
 Caribbean Institute of Business
 Caribbean Polytechnic Institute
 Caribbean Wesleyan College 
 Catholic College of Mandeville 
 College of Agriculture, Science and Education (CASE)
 College of Insurance and Professional Studies
 Crowne Professional College
 Durham College of Commerce (Kingston, Jamaica)
 Edna Manley College of Visual and Performing Arts
 G. C. Foster College of Physical Education and Sports
 Jamaica Bible College 
 Jamaica Theological Seminary 
 Management Institute for National Development 
 Mel Nathan College
 Midland Bible Institute
 United Theological College of the West Indies
 Vector Technology Institute
 Vocational Training Development Institute in Kingston and Saint Andrew and Saint James

Other institutions
 1 dental auxiliary school
 6 human employment and resources training (HEART) vocational training institutions
 29 vocational training centres
 1 vocational training development institute

See also
Education in Jamaica

References

 University Council of Jamaica Accredited Programmes

External links
Study in Jamaica - Online resource for Jamaican students

Jamaica education-related lists
Jamaica
Jamaica